9HP is ZF Friedrichshafen AG's trademark name for its nine-speed automatic transmission models (9-speed transmission with Hydraulic converter and Planetary gearsets) for transverse engine applications, designed by ZF's subsidiary in Saarbrücken and built in Gray Court, South Carolina. It is used in front-wheel drive and all-wheel drive vehicles.

Abstract 
Land Rover and Jeep demonstrated the world's first nine-speed automatic transmissions for passenger cars at the 2013 Geneva Motor Show. The 2014 Jeep Cherokee featured the world's first nine-speed automatic transmission for a passenger vehicle to market.

Specifications

Basic Concept 
The 9HP is only 0.24 inches (6 mm) longer than, and weighs 16.5 lbs (7.5 kg) less than, the outgoing six-speed transmission. The compact packaging is achieved by using a number of innovative design features: a new compact hydraulic vane-type pump, two patented dog clutches, which replace bulkier conventional clutch packs, and a nested gear set. ZF claims that it is able to save an average of 16% in fuel compared with current 6-speed automatic transmissions. The gear ratio spread is 9.8085:1. The transmission has a torque range between 280 and 480 Nm.

Technical data

How It Works 
An Animated Drive Line Schematic & A Rotational Speeds Nomogram

These ordinates are positioned on the abscissa in strict accordance with the proportions of the sun gears' teeth numbers relative to those of their rings. Consequently, the output ratios on the ordinate C4 (carrier of the last planetary gearset RS4) follows closely to those of the actual transmission. Note that elements A and F are labelled interchanged (cf. legend below).

9HP Nomogram 

▶️ Interactive Nomogram

This interactive nomogram is a real geometric calculator exactly representing the rotational speeds of the transmission's 3x4 = 12 internal shafts for each of its 9 ratios (+ reverse), grouped according to their 5 permanent coupling on 4 joint ordinates and 3 independent ordinates. These ordinates are positioned on the abscissa in strict accordance with the proportions of the sun gears' teeth numbers relative to those of their rings. Consequently, the output ratios on the 6th ordinate (carrier of the fourth planetary gearset) follows closely those of the actual transmission. This advantageous geometric construction sets us free from Willis' famous and tedious formula, because all calculations are exclusively determined by lengths ratios, respectively teeth numbers on the abscissa for the 4 epicyclic ratios, and of rotational speeds on the 6th ordinate for the 10 gear ratios.

Legend:
A : Dog Clutch (couples r1+s2 with input shaft)
B : Clutch (couples s1 with input shaft)
C : Brake (blocks s1 sun gear)
D : Brake (blocks r2 ring gear)
E : Clutch (couples c3+r4 with input shaft)
F : Dog Brake (blocks s3+s4 sun gears)

List of ZF 9HP variants

Applications

Acura 
 TLX (V6 models, 2015–2020)
 MDX (2016–2020, non-hybrid models)

Alfa Romeo 
 Alfa Romeo Tonale 2.0T engine

Chrysler 
 Chrysler 200
 Chrysler Pacifica/Voyager minivan (gasoline version)

FIAT 
 Fiat Dobló/RAM Promaster City 2015-on
 Fiat 500X
 Fiat Toro
 Fiat Ducato 2020

MG 
 MG 7 (2023)

Opel/Vauxhall 
 Opel Astra (2020; Diesel Engine)
 Opel Insignia (2020; Diesel Engine)

Honda 
 CR-V (diesel, 2015-)
 Pilot (2016–2020 optional, 2021 standard on all trims)
 Avancier/UR-V (2016- 2.0L turbo)
 Odyssey (2018–19 [standard, 10-speed automatic optional])
 Honda Passport (2019- )
 Honda Ridgeline (2020- )
 Honda Civic (diesel, 2018- )

Infiniti 
 Infiniti QX60 2022

Jeep 
 Jeep Cherokee (KL)
 Jeep Renegade
 Jeep Compass (MP)
 Jeep Grand Commander

Ram Trucks 
 Ram ProMaster City
 Ram ProMaster 2022-

Land Rover 

 Range Rover Evoque
 Land Rover Discovery Sport

Jaguar 
 Jaguar E-Pace

Nissan 
 2022–Nissan Pathfinder

Technical imperfections 
The transmission has been problematic, as customers of Jeep, Chrysler, and Acura models equipped with the transmission have experienced problems in their vehicles regarding slow shifting and noisy operation. ZF has said this is due to software problems, not mechanical issues.

Chrysler issued Technical Service Bulletins (TSB) for the 2014 Jeep Cherokee to "fix rough and delayed gearshifts", and Acura has issued transmission-related recalls for the 2015 Acura TLX.

Production 
Production of the 9HP started in 2013 at ZF's Gray Court facility in Laurens, South Carolina. 400,000 units are produced per year.

Production of the 9HP for Fiat and Chrysler vehicles began in May 2013 at Indiana Transmission Plant I (ITPI), followed by Tipton Transmission Plant in Tipton County, Indiana in May 2014.

See also 
List of Chrysler transmissions
List of ZF transmissions

Notes

External links 
ZF’s 9-Speed 9HP Transmission Puts Dog Clutches On The Leash

References 

9HP